Lophiocharon trisignatus, most commonly known as the three-spot frogfish or the spot-tailed anglerfish, is a species of fish in the family Antennariidae. It is native to the Indo-Pacific, where it ranges from Singapore and the Philippines to Australia. It is a benthic species found near inshore reefs at a depth range of 2 to 52 m (7 to 171 ft). The species is oviparous, laying clusters of eggs which are then attached to the side of the male parent's body. It is currently unknown what purpose this serves, although it is thought to either be a brooding strategy or a method for luring potential prey items. It reaches 14.7 cm (5.8 in) SL, making it the largest known member of Lophiocharon, as well as the first of the three to be described, although it was initially placed in the now-invalid genus Chironectes.

References 

Antennariidae
Fish described in 1844
Fish of Singapore
Fish of the Philippines
Fish of Australia